The 2019–20 Czech National Football League (known as the Fortuna národní liga for sponsorship reasons) was the 27th season of the Czech Republic's second tier football league. Fixtures for the season were announced on 19 June 2019. Pardubice won the competition, while relegation was confirmed for Sokolov and Vítkovice.

Třinec returned positive COVID-19 tests in June 2020, resulting in an enforced 14-day quarantine for their team and the postponement of three of their matches. Their home match against Vlašim, which Třinec lost on 17 July 2020, was subsequently played three days after the rest of the league had finished.

Team changes

From FNL 

 České Budějovice (promoted to 2019–20 Czech First League)
 Znojmo (relegated to Moravian-Silesian Football League)
 Táborsko (relegated to Bohemian Football League)

To FNL 

 FK Dukla Prague (relegated from 2018–19 Czech First League)
 FK Slavoj Vyšehrad (promoted from 2018–19 Bohemian Football League)
 SK Líšeň (promoted from 2018–19 Moravian–Silesian Football League)

Team overview

League table

Results

References

External links

 Fortuna národní liga

2
Czech National Football League seasons
Czech Republic

Czech National Football League